Coleophora calycotomella is a moth of the family Coleophoridae. It is found from the Netherlands and Germany to the Iberian Peninsula, Sardinia, Sicily and Crete.

The larvae feed on Adenocarpus, Calicotome and common broom (Cytisus scoparius). They create a composite leaf case with a mouth angle of about 30°. The frontal leaf fragment is brown and hairy, while the older parts are pale and almost smooth. Full-grown larvae can be found in March and May.

References

calycotomella
Moths described in 1869
Moths of Europe
Taxa named by Henry Tibbats Stainton